Piran is a town and municipality in Slovenia.

Piran may also refer to:

Saint Piran (6th century), patron saint of Cornwall
Piran, Azerbaijan, a village in Azerbaizan
Piran, Chaharmahal and Bakhtiari, a village in Chaharmahal and Bakhtiari Province, Iran
Piran, a Kurdish tribe
Piran, Kermanshah, a village in Kermanshah Province, Iran
Piran, Hirmand, a village in Sistan and Baluchestan Province, Iran
Piran Rural District, in West Azerbaijan Province, Iran
Pîran, Turkey, the Kurdish name for the city of Dicle
Gulf of Piran, a gulf in the northern Adriatic Sea
 Piran-e Pir, "Master of Masters", an epithet of the Sufi Abdul Qadir Jilani.

See also
Pirhan, a village in Cyprus